Disenfranchised grief is a term coined by Dr. Kenneth J. Doka in 1989.This concept describes the fact that grief isn’t acknowledged on a personal or societal level in modern day Euro-centric culture. For example, those around you may not view your loss as a significant loss, and they may think you don’t have the right to grieve. They might not like how you may or may not be expressing your grief, and thus they may feel uncomfortable, or judgmental. This is not a conscious way of thinking for most individuals, as it is deeply engrained in our psyche. This can be extremely isolating, and push you to question the depth of your grief and this loss you’ve experienced. This concept is viewed as a ”type of grief”, but it more so can be viewed as a "side effect" of grief. This also is not only applicable to grief in the case of death, but also the many other forms of grief. There are few support systems, rituals, traditions, or institutions such as bereavement leave available to those experiencing grief and loss

Even widely recognized forms of grief can become disenfranchised when well-meaning friends and family attempt to set a time limit on a bereaved person's right to grieve. For example, the need to regulate mourning and restore a state of normal work activity severely impacted the grieving process of victims of the Oklahoma City bombing, according to American scholar Edward Linenthal. Grieving for deceased children was redefined as post-traumatic stress disorder if parents were not "over it" within two weeks.

Disenfranchised losses 
Examples of events that may lead to disenfranchised grief include:

 deaths among distant, disapproved, or unrecognized relationships
 the death of a friend, co-worker, or patient
 the death of an ex-spouse or a partner in an extramarital affair
 deaths under socially difficult circumstances
 the death of a loved one due to suicide or murder 
 a death due to socially stigmatized cause, such as HIV/AIDS, drug addiction, or lung cancer
 the death is due to capital punishment of a criminal
 losses that society deems less worthy of grief than the death of a child or adult
 pregnancy loss due to miscarriage or abortion
 infertility
 the death or other loss of a pet
 a parent's loss or surrender of a child to adoption or foster care
 a child's loss of their birth parents through adoption
 other non-death losses
 the loss of a relationship with a person who has become severely disabled (e.g., comatose, advanced stages of dementia)
 a trauma in the family a generation prior
 the loss of a home or place of residence
 the diagnosis of a sexually transmitted infection 
 the loss of a job 
 the loss of heirlooms or other objects of sentimental or personal significance.

Disenfranchised grievers 
Sometimes, people believe that a particular person is not capable of grieving.  This commonly happens with very young children and with disabled people.

Additionally, grieving people may be disenfranchised because of their circumstances.

Loss of a grandchild can be extremely difficult for a grandparent, but the grandparent's grief is often disenfranchised because they are not part of the immediate family. Attention and support is given to the child's parents and siblings, but the grandparent's grief is two-fold as they have not only grieving the loss of their grandchild, but are also grieving for their adult children who have lost the child. This phenomenon is termed double-grief by Davidson and it makes bereavement even more difficult.

Loss of an ex-spouse is disenfranchised due to the lack of a current or ongoing personal relationship between the former couple. Although the marriage has ended, the relationship has not, and there are ties between the two people that will forever be there including: shared children, mutual friendships, and financial connections. Research has shown that those couples who never resolved conflicts after the relationship ended experienced much more grief than those who had. The grievers experience guilt and thoughts of "what might have been", similar to those of widows.

Loss of a child by adoption is often disenfranchised because the decision to give a child up for adoption is voluntary, and therefore it is not acceptable by society to grieve. Birth mothers lack support, and are expected to just move on and pretend the child does not exist. Many birth mothers experience regret and have thoughts of what might have been or of reuniting with the child.

Relationships

Many types of relationships are not legitimized by society; therefore when one person in the relationship dies, the other may not have their grief legitimized and it can become disenfranchised.  For example, following the death of a partner in a homosexual relationship, societal supports can tend to prioritize the immediate family, invalidating the significance of the romantic relationship and loss for the grieving partner (McNutt & Yakushko, 2013).

Another example may be a former partner, such as the death of an ex-spouse (a person who the griever was previously married to, but eventually divorced). The death of an ex-spouse does not typically receive the same recognition as the death of a current spouse. Another type of relationship is one in which the griever and the person who died did not necessarily have a close personal relationship. This relationship may include coworkers, doctor and nurse relationships with patients, or even people that the griever does not know personally at all, such as celebrities. Relationships formed online are often not recognized or validated by society, for example where friendships are made through online games and social media. However, when one person dies, the griever or person that did not die in the relationship will often experience disenfranchised grief (Doka, 1989).

Responses
There are many models for dealing with grief. The Kübler-Ross model describes grieving in five steps or stages: denial, anger, bargaining, depression, and acceptance (Kübler-Ross, 1969).  In other words, in order to begin grieving one must first endorse the loss, and then express emotion.  The griever must then accept the loss and adjust to the change the death or loss caused in his or her life (Cordaro, 2012).  Over the years, however, how grief is conceptualised has moved away from predictable stages that lead to 'recovery' or 'closure', towards an understanding of grief that addresses the complexity and diversity of the grieving experience (Australian Psychological Society, 2016).  Models such as Worden's tasks of grief (2008) and the dual-process model (Stroebe and Schutt, 1999) offer frameworks for dealing with grief in a way that enhances the self awareness of the grieving person (Australian Psychological Society, 2016).

Disenfranchised grief presents some complications that are not always present in other grieving processes.  First, there are usually intensified reactions to death or loss.  For example, the griever may become more depressed or angry due to not being able to fully express his or her grief.  Secondly, disenfranchised grief means society does not recognize the death or loss; therefore, the griever does not receive strong social support and may be isolated. As disenfranchised grief is not legitimized by others, the bereaved person may be denied access to rituals, ceremonies, or the right to express their thoughts and emotions  (McKissock & McKissock, 1998). When supporting someone through disenfranchised grief it is important to acknowledge and validate their loss and grief (McKissock & McKissock, 1998).

See also

Ambiguous loss
 Anticipatory grief
 Delayed grief
 Grief

References

Sources
 Aloi, J. A. (2009). Nursing the disenfranchised: Women who have relinquished an infant for adoption. Journal of Psychiatric and Mental Health Nursing, 16(1), 27–31. doi:10.1111/j.1365-2850.2008.01324.x
 Cordaro, M. (2012). Pet loss and disenfranchised grief: Implications for mental health counseling practice. Journal of Mental Health Counseling, 34(4), 283–294.
 Doka, K. J. (1989). Disenfranchised grief: Recognizing hidden sorrow. Lexington, MA, England: Lexington Books/D. C. Heath and Com.
 Havelin, L. (2012, February 3). Children and Pet Loss. Retrieved October 22, 2014.
 Humphrey, K. (2009). Counseling strategies for loss and grief. Alexandria, VA: American Counseling Association.
 Kamerman, J. (1993). Latent functions of enfranchising the disenfranchised griever. Death studies, 17(3), 281-287
 Kubler-Ross, E. (1969). On death and dying. New York, NY: Scribner.
  McNutt, B., & Yakushko, O. (2013). Disenfranchised grief among lesbian and gay bereaved individuals. Journal of LGBT Issues in Counseling, 7(1), 87-116.
 Perrucci, A. (2014, October 7). High court refuses to rule—and gives tacit victory—on same-sex marriage. Retrieved October 22, 2014.
 Purtuesi D.R. (1995) Silent voices heard: impact of the birth- mother's experience then and now.
 Some, Sobonfu (Photographer). (2012, May). Embracing Grief.

Further reading
 Kenneth J. Doka, editor. Disenfranchised Grief: Recognizing Hidden Sorrow Lexington Books, 1989.

External links
 Disenfranchised Grief
 Grief and Disenfranchised Grief

Grief
Racism